Antonio Krastev (Bulgarian: Антонио Кръстев, 10 October 1961 – 9 July 2020) was a Bulgarian super heavyweight Olympic-style weightlifter best known for his 1987 heaviest ever snatch in IWF competition, at 216 kg. This was only equalled by Behdad Salimi of Iran at the 2016 Summer Olympics, and finally surpassed at the 2017 European Championships by Lasha Talakhadze, who now holds the record of 225 kg. Krastev's record was no longer official after the restructuring of the weight classes in 1993 and 1998.

Life
Krastev was born in Haskovo and was a two-time World Weightlifting Championships gold medalist and two time European Weightlifting Championships gold medalist, but never competed in the Olympic Games; he was originally intended to represent Bulgaria at the 1988 Olympic Games in the superheavyweight category.

Two of his teammates tested positive for Furosemide and the Bulgarian weightlifting federation pulled the rest of the team out of the competition the day before Krastev was scheduled to compete. At the time, Krastev was a two-time World champion and two-time European champion, and a heavy favorite for the gold medal.

Antonio Krastev later retired from weightlifting in Bulgaria, and moved to New York City, where he found employment as a nightclub bouncer. He began training, as his own coach, at the Lost Battalion Hall weightlifting gym, and he developed his strength to an internationally competitive level. Krastev applied for U.S. citizenship in order to compete as an American at the 1992 Olympic Games in Barcelona, but his application was denied, and he was thus unable to compete. Krastev eventually did obtain his American citizenship and resided in New York State.

He died at the age of 58 in a car accident on the night of July 9, 2020, in Minnesota.

Major results

World records
15 November 1986 Snatch - 212.5 kg Super Heavyweight Sofia 
15 November 1986 Snatch - 215 kg Super Heavyweight Sofia 
9 May 1987 Snatch - 215.5 kg Super Heavyweight Reims 
9 May 1987 Total - 467.5 kg Super Heavyweight Reims
13 September 1987 Snatch - 216 kg Super Heavyweight Ostrava

References

External links
 

1961 births
2020 deaths
Olympic weightlifters of Bulgaria
Bulgarian strength athletes
Bulgarian male weightlifters
People from Haskovo
World record setters in weightlifting
European Weightlifting Championships medalists
World Weightlifting Championships medalists
Road incident deaths in Minnesota
Sportspeople from Haskovo Province
20th-century Bulgarian people
21st-century Bulgarian people